As Long as You Love Me may refer to:

Albums
As Long as You Love Me, an album by Mickey Thomas, 1976
As Long as You Love Me, an album by Japanese band Hal, 2002

Songs
"As Long as You Love Me" (Backstreet Boys song), 1997
"As Long as You Love Me" (Caleb Johnson song), 2014
"As Long as You Love Me" (Justin Bieber song), 2012
"As Long As You Love Me", a song by David Whitfield, 1962
"As Long As You Love Me", a song by The Impressions from The Impressions, 1961
"As Long As You Love Me", a song by James Darren, 1971

Other uses
"As Long as You Love Me", an episode of Police Women of Memphis

See also
 "I Don't Care" (Just as Long as You Love Me), a 1964 single by Buck Owens